Sakuji Tanaka was the President of Rotary International. He has served as the Chairman of the Daika Company and President of the National Household Papers Distribution Association of Japan.

Tanaka served as the President of Rotary International from 2012 to 2013.

Sakuji is married to Kyoko and they have three children.

Notes

Rotary International leaders
Living people
Year of birth missing (living people)
Japanese businesspeople